Korean martial arts (Hangul: 무술, Hanja: 武術, musul or Hangul: 무예, Hanja: 武藝, muye)  are fighting practices and methods which have their place in the history of Korea but have been adapted for use by both military and non-military personnel as a method of personal growth or recreation. The history of Korean martial arts can be traced as far back as the prehistoric era. The ancestors of modern Korean people migrated and settled in the Korean Peninsula as early as the 28th century BC, a geopolitical region besieged by thousands of known documented instances of foreign invasions. Consequently, the Korean people developed unique martial arts and military strategies in order to defend themselves and their territory.

Today, Korean martial arts are being practiced worldwide; more than one in a hundred of the world's population practices some form of taekwondo. Among the best recognized Korean practices using weapons are traditional Korean archery and Kumdo, the Korean adaptation of the Japanese Kendo. The best known unarmed Korean martial arts are Taekwondo and Hapkido , though such traditional practices such as ssireum -  Korean Wrestling - and Taekkyon - Korean Foot Fighting - are rapidly gaining in popularity both inside and outside the country. In November 2011, Taekkyon was recognized by UNESCO and placed on its Intangible Cultural Heritage of Humanity List.  There has also been a revival of traditional Korean swordsmanship arts as well as knife fighting and archery.

History

Early history

Wrestling, called ssireum, is the oldest form of ground fighting in Korea, while Subak was the upright martial art of foot soldiers. Weapons were an extension of those unarmed skills. Besides being used to train soldiers, both of these traditional martial arts were also popular among villagers during festivals for dance, mask, acrobatic, and sport fighting. These martial arts were also considered basic physical education. However, Koreans (as with the neighboring Mongols) relied more heavily on bows and arrows in warfare than they did on close-range weapons.

It appears that during the Goguryeo dynasty, (37 BC – 668) subak/taekkeyon or ssireum (empty-handed fighting), swordsmanship, spear-fighting and horse riding were practiced. In 1935, paintings that showed martial arts were found on the walls of royal tombs believed to have been built for Goguryeo kings sometime between the years 3 and 427 AD. Which techniques were practiced during that period is, however, something that cannot be determined from these paintings. References to Subak can be found in government records from the Goguryeo dynasty through the Joseon dynasty, until the 15th century, after which its popularity declined It reappears only in 1790 book about martial arts titled Muyedobotongji (무예도보통지).

It is believed that the warriors from the Silla Dynasty (57 BC-935 AD) known as the Hwarang learned subak from the neighboring Goguryeo armies when they appealed for their help against invading Japanese pirates.  But this remains a conjecture, as there is zero actual documentation of such in Korean records.  There also remains no known documentation of specific military training by the Hwarang.

The development of Subak continued during the Goryeo Dynasty (935–1392). Goryeo records that mention the martial arts always include passages about Subak. The Joseon government, however, outlawed the practice of Subak as a public spectacle in response to problems arising from the betting practices of large numbers of Korean farmers and landowners (these betting practices included wagering land and sometimes family members). Subak disappears in the records of the Joseon Dynasty to make place to Taekkyon. Taekkyon players are portrayed in several paintings from that era. The most famous painting is probably the Daegwaedo (Hangul: 대괘도, Hanja: 大快圖), painted in 1846 by Hyesan Yu Suk (혜산 유숙, 1827–1873), which shows men competing in both ssireum (씨름) and Taekkyon.

Goryo period
With the Mongol conquest, the Korean military was reorganized around the mounted archer.  Armor and weaponry became very similar to Mongol armor and weaponry.  Acrobatic horsemanship (masangjae), falconry and polo (Gyeokgu) were imported. The Korean Composite bow (which is very similar to the medieval Mongol bow) was adopted at this time.  The unique construction of the Korean Gakgung bow shows the original form of the Mongol bow, before the Manchus improved it with stronger and bigger ears. As the military class in late Goryeo was almost entirely populated by ethnic Mongols in practice, the Joseon Army also carried on the mounted archer tradition. (Yi Seong-gye, the founder of the Joseon dynasty was a hereditary Mongol darughachi of Korean origin, administering the Mongol province of Ssangseong in N.E. Korea. Choi Young made his reputation fighting for the Mongols in northern China, putting down Han rebellions in the last days of the Yuan dynasty.) Until the publication of Muyedobotongji in 1795, archery remained a singular Korean martial art, testable during the military portion of the Gwageo (National Service Examination)

Joseon Dynasty Martial Arts
As the continuation of Goryo military, the Joseon military maintained the primacy of the bow as its main stay weapon. Gungdo remained the most prestigious of all martial arts in Korea. Gungdo was the single most important testable event in gwageo, the national service exam used to select Army officers from 1392 to Gabo Reform in 1894 when gwageo system was terminated.

During the Imjin War (1592–1598), Toyotomi Hideyoshi launched the conquest of China's Ming Dynasty by way of Korea. However, after two unsuccessful campaigns towards the allied forces of Korea and China and his death, his forces returned to Japan in 1598. but with heavy loss of men and cultural heritage. It was also during this war that the famous turtle ships (Geobukseon, 거북선) were used by Admiral Yi Sun-sin. These ships were covered with metal shields, much like the shell of a turtle, which could withstand the gun attacks of the Japanese.

In 1593, Korea received help from China to win back Pyongyang. During one of the battles, the Koreans learned about a martial art manual titled Ji Xiao Xin Shu (紀效新書), written by the Chinese military strategist Qi Jiguang. King Seonjo (1567–1608) took a personal interest in the book, and ordered his court to study the book. This led to the creation of the Muyejebo (무예제보, Hanja: 武藝諸譜) in 1599 by Han Gyo, who had studied the use of several weapons with the Chinese army. Soon this book was revised in the Muyejebo Seokjib and in 1759, the book was revised and published at the Muyesinbo (Hangul: 무예신보, Hanja: 武藝新譜).

During the Imjin war, three main weapons were identified by all sides as representative of their armies.  The Japanese were known for their arquebus.  The Ming Dynasty Chinese forces were known for their lance.  Koreans were known for their Pyeonjeon used in conjunction with the Korean composite bow.  During the war itself, Korea began adopting the Arquebus, eventually mastering it.  Korean arquebusiers became so well known for their ability to kill tigers, which were rampant in Korea throughout its history until its final extermination in 1919, that Ming China requested the assistance of Korean arquebusiers against the rising Manchus in 1619.  At the Battle of Sarhu,  Korean order of battle was composed of 10,000 arquebusiers out of 13,000 total men. This event illustrates how Korea quickly adopted modern weaponry and discarded close quarter martial arts.

Following the 1636 Second Manchu invasion of Korea, where Manchu composite archers defeated Koreans, who were also mostly composed of archers, supplemented by arquebusiers, the Manchu Qing Dynasty demanded Korean arquebusiers in their battles against Russia in the late 1600s.  In 1654 and 1658, Joseon deployed 400 of its best tiger hunters as Arquebusiers to fight the Russians along the Amur River during the Sino-Russian border conflicts.  Again, no record of swordmen, empty hand martial arts being used or favored by the Korean Army during this period.

In 1790, the Royal Korean Army published the richly illustrated Muyedobotongji (Hangul: 무예도보통지, Hanja: 武藝圖譜通志). The book does not mention ssireum, subak, or taekkyon, but shows influences from Chinese and Japanese fighting systems. The book, deals mostly with armed combat like sword fighting, double-sword fighting, spear fighting, stick fighting, and so on. The chapter that deals with a style of empty-handed fighting called kwonbeop ("fist methods," a generic name for empty-handed combat; the word is the Korean pronunciation of quanfa) shows techniques that resemble Chinese martial arts—quite different from taekkyon. According to the Muyedobotongji, empty-handed combat should be learned before armed combat, since it forms the basis of a martial education. It also states that internal styles are better suited for fighting than external styles. The name for the martial arts of the Muyedobotongji is shippalgi.  This manual was intended as a training manual for Soldiers in the 1790s, as military arts had withered by that time.  Despite the publication of this manual, it was never widely distributed, and there was no renaissance of martial arts in Korea.

In 1895, Emperor Gojong invited 40 sword masters from Japan to begin teaching the art of the sword to his Korean Army cadets and police officers.  This was decided upon due to the lack of native sword masters in Korea at the time .  The teaching of the Art of the Sword continued well after the 1910 Annexation, until the art was formally named Kendo in Japan, and Kumdo in Korean.

In 1899, Emperor Gojong of Korean Empire, with the encouragement of Prince Heinrich of Prussia, who was visiting Korea at the time, established Gungdo as an official sport, allowing it to flourish throughout the next century, being recognized by the Japanese Occupation government as a folk art in 1920.  The Korean Gungdo Federation was established in Seoul in 1920.  Along with Ssireum, Gungdo achieved nationwide popularity within Korea throughout the 1930s and 1940s, even as Japanese martial arts also garnered a large following on the peninsula.

During the Donghak Rebellion, much of the rebels used old matchlock arquebuses against the modern rifles of the Korean and Japanese Army.  Although the rebels initially fought against the Korean government, following the fall of Jeonju, the Korean government had invited in the Japanese Army to help suppress the peasant rebels.  With the annexation of Korea in 1910, all matchlocks were confiscated and destroyed by the Japanese.  However, the Japanese did not stop the production and keeping of bows, which they did not consider as a threat to internal security.

Modern Korean martial arts
The two extant martial arts at the time of Japanese take over in 1910, Ssireum and Gungdo grew in popularity during the Japanese occupation period, both of them founding their current federations in 1920.  Many of the oldest Gungdo clubs in Seoul, including Hwanghakjeong (near Gyeongbokgung Palace) and Sukhojeon on Namsan (Seoul) were founded in the 1930s. Taekkyon did not enjoy much popularity during the occupation era.  It has grown in popularity only in the 21st century through the continuance of Song Deok-Gi (1893-1987). 
Most Koreans learned Japanese martial arts during the occupation period.

Currently these new arts such as Taekwondo and Hapkido created since 1945 remain the most popular in Korea. Other modern styles such as Tae Soo Do and Hwa Rang Do, which have a sizeable presence in the US and Europe, are almost unknown in Korea, as the founders relocated to the US and focused on operations in the US. Gungdo participation is limited by the high cost of the equipment, with a traditional horn made reflex bow costing upwards of $1000, and most Gungdo clubs in Seoul charging over $1000 application fee for membership, similar to golf clubs.  This limits participation to the upper and upper middle class.  Many Korean junior high schools, high schools, and colleges maintain martial arts teams to include ssireum, kumdo (kendo), judo and Taekwondo. Yong In University for instance, focuses on martial arts training for international competitions.

It should also be considered that Korean martial arts are still in a state of evolution as witnessed by recently emerging arts such as Teuk Gong Moo Sool and Yongmoodo. There is now also the development of Korean arts influenced by Western boxing, Muay Thai or Judo, these would include Gongkwon Yusul and Kyuk Too Ki.

Types of Korean martial arts

Taekwondo
Taekwondo (태권도; 跆拳道) is the national sport of both Koreas and the most recognized of the Korean martial arts. It is practiced all over the world by over 70 million people. Taekwondo is a martial art which can be used for self-defense as well as a sport. Taekwondo has hand, kicking/leg techniques, blocks, throws, takedowns, and in some dojangs, grappling, though the latter three are practiced for self-defense purposes and their use is forbidden in competition. Some dojangs may also include weapon techniques, most notably a staff. Taekwondo is best known for its variety of kicking techniques. However, it encompasses just as many hand techniques, throws, blocks, and takedowns as its kicks. As a sport, it is an event in most major, multi-sports games, including the Olympic Games and the World University Games.

Taekkyon/Taekkyeon

Also romanized informally as Taekgyeon, Taekkyeon, or Taekyun.
Currently acknowledged as one of the oldest martial arts of Korea. Taekkyon is concerned with applying both the hands and feet at the same time to unbalance, trip, or throw the opponent. Hands and feet are always used together.

Taekkyon has many whole-body techniques with fully integrated armwork. Although Taekkyon primarily utilizes kicking, punching, and arm strikes thrown from a mobile stance and does not provide a framework for groundfighting, it does incorporate a variety of different throws, takedowns, and grappling techniques to complement its striking focus.

The survivance of Song Deok-gi, the last Taekkyon Master of the Joseon dynasty secured the transmission of the art: Taekkyon joined the list of Important Intangible Cultural Properties of Korea No. 76" on June 1, 1983. It is one of two Korean martial art which possesses such a classification. In November 2011 Taekkyon was recognized on the UNESCO's Intangible World Heritage Art list, becoming the first martial art recognized by UNESCO.

Subak

Subak is an ancient martial art originally from China. A long time ago it branched off into Korea. It no longer exists in China as its lineage has died off. However, it still exists in Korea practiced by a dwindling few.

Within Korea each region had their own style of Subak. Subak styles from region to region differed slightly.

Only two Subak styles remain today. One is taught as purely as Subak. And the other Subak style has been absorbed into modern Taekkyon by Master Shin Han Song.

When Master Shin Han Song tried to resurrect Taekkyon after the Korean war, he sought instruction from the Taekkyon master Song Doki, & instruction from the Subak master Il Dong. Shin Han Song then combined Taekkyon & Subak together.

Subak is of ancient origins and is different from Soo Bahk Do, which is a modern martial art using the same name (same pronunciation yet different spelling).

Tang Soo Do/Soo Bahk Do

Tang Soo Do is a striking martial art, which was developed during the 20th century, yet it has its roots in ancient Korean martial arts, as well as martial arts from other nations. Although the name "Tang Soo Do" had been used before by the likes of Master Wong Kuk Lee, it is Hwang Kee who is usually credited as the creator of what is today known as Tang Soo Do, or Moo Duk Kwan Tang Soo Do, the school from which all others come from. As a child, Hwang Kee witnessed a man defend himself from several assailants using kicking techniques. (He was most likely using Taekkyon.) He followed this man home and watched him train from a distance. When asked, the man refused to teach Hwang Kee, but he began to watch the man, mimicking his movements, eventually developing such ability that he was considered a master. He also seems to have studied Karate briefly, as recollected by Wong Kuk Lee. In his travels, he also studied Yang style Tai Chi Chuan and a Northern style of Kung Fu, particularly the Tang Tui exercise, under a Chinese Kung Fu master named Yang. Combining his knowledge of various martial arts, he sought to teach his art as Hwa Soo Do, the Way of the Flowering Hand, but it proved unpopular. He then decided to rename his art Tang Soo Do, the Way of the Chinese Hand, in order to link it to the more popular practice of Karate at the time, and put together a Hyung (forms) curriculum based on the Karate kata found in Shotokan Karate, as described by Gichin Funakoshi in one of his books. This particular style, Tang Soo Do, differentiated itself from Karate due to its emphasis on kicking, a vestige of the old Taekkyon arts.

After the Japanese occupation ended, Koreans sought to create a new national martial art/sport that had no link to the Japanese. To this end they decided to change the name of their art from Tang Soo Do and others to Taekwondo. Hwang Kee, however, did not desire to modify his art into a more generic form and rebelled against the change, something that brought him legal complications that caused him to move his family to the United States, where Tang Soo Do would continue to thrive. Later on, Hwang Kee was exposed to the ancient document Muyedobotongji, which depicted descriptions of ancient Korean martial arts such as Subak. Drawing inspiration from this document, and using his cross-training in Chinese Gung Fu, Okinawan Karate and Korean martial arts, he created the Chil Sung hyungs, a series of 7 hyungs and the Yuk Ro hyungs, a series of 6 hyungs, which brought back some of the combat elements of the ancient Subak art contained in the Muyedobotongji. Years later, Tang Soo Do would change its name to Soo Bahk Do (Way of the Striking Hand), however, both names are still in use by various associations and represent essentially the same martial art.

Tang Soo Do sets itself apart from other arts by identifying as a traditional martial art solely interested in self-defense, eschewing sport-orientation. It consists mostly of striking techniques focused towards self-defense, but also features several stand-up grappling and joint-manipulation techniques in its ho sin sul (self defense) and il sook si dae ryun (one-step sparring) curriculums. Tang Soo Do has had a sizable impact on the martial arts world, as the first example of Korean martial arts seen in the West, where people like Chuck Norris introduced and popularized its most characteristic techniques, such as the spinning back kick, spinning hook kick and spinning back fist. Curtis Bush, Dennis Alexio and Hector Peña have all used Tang Soo Do to become kickboxing and full contact world champions, and martial arts action stars the likes of Chuck Norris, Cynthia Rothrock and Hwang Jang Lee have popularized the art in film, television and, through homages, in video games as well.

Hapkido arts

Though various forms of grappling have been known in Korea for generations, Hapkido is essentially a 20th-century development, based on Japanese Daitō-ryū Aiki-jūjutsu but incorporating Korean striking techniques. The foundation for Hapkido was established by Choi Yong Sul. Returning from Japan in 1946, Choi began teaching material reportedly taught to Choi by Sokaku Takeda. Choi called his style Yawara [柔], but modified the name to Hapki Yusul [合氣 柔術] and later to Hapki Yukwonsul [合氣 柔拳術] to distinguish it from Japanese aiki-jujutsu, which was written in the same characters, and from which much of the early hapkido techniques were derived. Choi's practices were later renamed to Hapkido [合氣道] and students of Choi Yong Sul, such as Ji Han Jae, the late Myung Kwang-sik, the late Han Bong-soo and others helped to spread this art both inside and outside Korea. Since the hanja are identical to those of Aikido, Japanese Aikido and Korean Hapkido are often confused and stylistic similarities do cause these separate arts to approximate each other in some ways. In like manner, some variants of Hapkido such as Kuk Sool Won, Hwa Rang Do and Hankido have adopted a range of Chinese practices and execution.
Along with Taekwondo, Hapkido has helped to establish modern Korean martial arts by providing systemization and incorporating into other styles. This process complemented the other modern Korean martial art, Taekwondo.

Hanmudo
Hanmudo (한무도) is a recent hybrid Korean martial art, developed by Dr He-Young Kimm. He founded the World Hanmudo Association in 1989.

Gungdo

The reflex bow had been the most important weapon in Korean wars with Chinese dynasties and nomadic peoples, recorded from the 1st century BCE. Legend says the first king and founder of the Goguryeo, Go Jumong, was a master of archery, able to catch 5 flies with one arrow. Park Hyeokgeose, the first king of the Silla, was also said to be a skilled archer. Rumors of archers in Goguryeo and Silla presumably reached China; the ancient Chinese gave the people of the north east, Siberia, Manchuria and the Korean Peninsula, the name of Dongyi (東夷), the latter character (夷) being a combination of the two characters for "large" (大) and "bow" (弓).

However, the word 夷 was first used in Chinese history referring to the people South of Yellow River over 5,000 years ago. Later, when Yi 夷 people joined the tribes of Hua Xia [華夏] Chinese, 夷 meant outsiders. By that time, DongYi refers to Korean, as in Outsiders from the East

With the Mongol Conquest of Korea, archery became the main stay of Korean military. The swords and spears of the Korean and Chinese armies did very little to stop Mongol archers and were quickly discarded in favor of the composite bow, which proved to be a much more effective weapon against the Mongols. Yi Seonggye, the founding king of Joseon was known to have been a master archer.  In a battle against Japanese pirates, Yi Seonggye, assisted by Yi Bangsil, killed the young samurai commander "Agibaldo" with two successive arrows, one arrow unhelmeting the warrior, with the second arrow entering his mouth. In his letter to General Choi Young, Yi Seonggye lists as one of five reasons not to invade Ming Dynasty as during the monsoon season, glue holding together the composite bow weakens, reducing the effectiveness of the bow.

Founding of Joseon dynasty saw the retention of the composite bow as the main stay of the Joseon military. Archery was the main martial event tested during the military portion of the national service exam held annually from 1392 to 1894.  Under Joseon, archery reached its zenith, resulting in the invention of pyeonjeon, which saw great service against the Japanese in 1592 and against the Manchus in the early 1600s.

Until the Imjin wars, archery was the main long-range weapon system. During that war, the tactical superiority of the matchlock arquebus became apparent, despite its slow rate of fire and susceptibility to wet weather. However, it was the Korean composite bow, referred to as the "half bow" by the Japanese, that halted the Japanese at the Battle of Haengju as well as at the Battle of Ulsan.  Although Joseon adopted the arquebus during the Imjin War, the composite bow remained the main stay of its Army until the reforms of 1894. Under King Hyojong's military reforms, an attempt hosinsoolˌ'護身術' was made to revive horse archery as a significant element of the military.  It was also practiced for pleasure and for health, and many young males and a some many females - including the king - would spend their free time practicing it.

Korean swordsmanship

Korean spears

Teaching methods
The traditional Taekkyon system has no fixed curriculum. Every student is treated individually and thus the lesson is always different, although all of the basic skills are eventually covered. The basic skills are taught in temporary patterns, that evolve as the student learns. Basic skills are expounded on and variations of each single skill are then practised, in multiple new combinations. When the student has learned all the variations of the basic movements & techniques, and can intermix all of them proficiently, they're encouraged to perform the Taekkyon Dance. Taekkyon is a Ten-year technique.

Modern Korean martial arts' systemization and presentation are very similar to their Japanese counterparts (i.e., barefoot, with uniforms, classes executing techniques simultaneously by following the teacher's commands, and sometimes, showing respect by bowing to a portrait of the founder and/or to national flags). Many modern Korean martial arts also make use of colored belts to denote rank, tests to increase in rank, and the use of Korean titles when denoting the teacher denoting Japanese colonial influence. These include:

 Kyosanim: teacher.
 Sabomnim (사범님 / 師範님): Master instructor in some styles/systems but not all, e.g., taekwondo and hapkido.
 Kwanjangnim  (관장님 / 館長님): training hall owner/ kwan leader or master instructor in many, e.g., taekwondo and hapkido.
 Dojunim (도주님 / 道主님): keeper of the way. It is, typically, used to imply a founder of a style or system as in Ji Han-Jae Dojunim of S(h)in Moo Hapkido.

NOTE: remove the word "nim" for the actual titles as "nim" is an honorific meaning "sir" or its equivalent.

These Korean terms are based on Confucian rank systems (with the same Chinese characters). Many schools also make use of Korean terminology and numbers during practice, even if located outside [South] Korea.

Terminology
Korean martial arts are usually practiced in a dojang (도장), which may also be referred to as cheyukkwan (체육관 / 體育館, i.e., gymnasium). The practitioners wear a uniform or tobok (도복) with a belt or tti (띠) wrapped around it. This belt usually shows which grade the practitioner has attained. A student usually starts with a white belt and moves through a range of coloured belts (which differ from style to style) before reaching the black belt. The grades before black belt are referred to as geup or kup (급), while the black belt ranks are referred to as dan (단). In some cases, students younger than 16 years of age are not given dan grades, but rather "pum" or poom (품) or "junior black belt" grades. Some styles use stripes on the black belt to show which dan the practitioner holds. It is common for a system to have nine geup grades and nine dan grades. While it might only take a few months to go from one geup to the next, it can take years to go from one dan to the next. Most of the above terms are identical to those used in Japanese styles such as judo and karate, but with the Chinese characters read in Korean pronunciation, with a few exceptions. (Tobok, which originally meant a Taoist priest's garb, can be written with Chinese characters but is a purely Korean expression, used as an alternative to the Japanese 'gi'. Tti is a purely Korean word with no Chinese character.)

In some styles, like taekgyeon, the hanbok is worn instead of a tobok. The v-neck of many styles of taekwondo uniform was supposedly fashioned after the hanbok, but may simply be a modification for a pullover top to accommodate the modesty of female practitioners. (Standard jacket construction often requires females to wear a T-shirt, leotard, or sport bra underneath the jacket, whereas the pullover v-neck jacket does not.)

See also 
Taekkyon
Gungdo
Yongmudo
Bulmudo

Footnotes

References

Further reading
 
 
 
 Kim, S. H. (2001): Muye Dobo Tongji. Turtle Press.

 
Sports originating in Korea